KEA – Copenhagen School of Design and Technology (Danish: Københavns Erhvervsakademi, usually referred to as KEA), is a school of higher education in Copenhagen, Denmark. The academy is an independent self-owning institution subordinated to the Ministry of Science, Innovation and Higher Education. Degree programmes offered are mainly applied degrees, especially in design, technology and IT. The academy grants undergraduate and Professional degrees and has no graduate school. In addition to full-time studies the academy offers supplemental education, part-time programmes at bachelor's level and short-term courses for people who need to strengthen their qualifications. With  4,717 full-time students and 3,907 part-time students and about 350 employees as of 2015, the academy is one of the largest business academies in Denmark.

Campus
KEA currently consists of 8 different locations, most of which are concentrated in the districts of Nørrebro and North West.

The main campus, KEA Guldbergsgade, occupies a dense site in the area between Guldbergsgade, Mimersgade, Peter Fabers Gade and Nørrebrogade. It opened in 2013, designed by Bertelsen & Scheving Arkitekter and is partly located in a converted 4-story industrial building from the 1950s, a former printing business.

The other buildings are located on Prinsesse Charlottes Gade (No. 38)in Nørrebro and Bispevej (No, 5),  Lygten (No. 16 and 37) in North West,  Lersø Parkallé (No. 2), Landskronagade (No. 64) and Rosenvængets Allé (No. 20B) and Frederikkevej (No. 8) in Hellerup. The Landskronagade campus tenancy was terminated in 2016, and operations were moved out in the summer of 2017.

Programmes

Academy Professional Degree Programme 
 Computer science
 Design, technology and business
 IT technology
 Multimedia design and communication
 Production technology

Top-up Bachelor's degrees 
 E-Concept Development
 Design & Business
 Software Development
 Web Development
 IT Security
 Product Development & Interactive Development

Bachelor's degrees 
 Architectural Technology and Construction Management
 Business, Economics and IT
 Jewellery, Technology and Business

References

External links
 Official website
 Profile on the Education Guide website of the Danish Ministry of Science, Innovation and Higher Education
 Translations of Danish educational terms through proclamations of the Ministry of Science, Innovation and Higher Education

Higher education in Copenhagen